Kostenica may refer to:
 Kostenica, Montenegro
 Kostenica (Prokuplje), Serbia